Swinbourne Hadley (19 September 1904 – 29 April 1970) was a New Zealand rugby union player. A hooker, Hadley represented  at a provincial level, and was a member of the New Zealand national side, the All Blacks, on their 1928 tour to South Africa. He played 11 matches for the All Blacks on that tour, including all four Test matches.

On 30 March 1929, Hadley married Susan Cosnett at Sacred Heart Church, Ponsonby. During World War II, he served as a corporal with 24 Infantry Battalion, 2nd New Zealand Expeditionary Force, and was taken prisoner of war in Greece on 13 December 1941. He was later invalided home.  Hadley died in Auckland on 29 April 1970, and he was buried at Waikumete Cemetery.

References

External links
 Photograph of Hadley in 1928

1904 births
1970 deaths
Rugby union players from the Northland Region
New Zealand rugby union players
New Zealand international rugby union players
Auckland rugby union players
Rugby union hookers
New Zealand military personnel of World War II
New Zealand prisoners of war in World War II
Burials at Waikumete Cemetery
New Zealand Army soldiers